Olho d'Água das Flores is a municipality located in the western of the Brazilian state of Alagoas. Its population is 21,738 (2020) and its area is 183 km².

References

Municipalities in Alagoas